Titaea timur is a moth of the family Saturniidae. It is only known from Misahualli in Ecuador.

External links
 The Saturniidae fauna of Napo Province, Ecuador: an overview (Lepidoptera: Saturniidae)

Arsenurinae
Moths described in 1915